Himachali may refer to:
the people and culture of the Indian state of Himachal Pradesh
Music of Himachal Pradesh
Himachali languages, the Indo-Aryan languages spoken in the state

Language and nationality disambiguation pages